Tirukkandalam Sivanandeswarar Temple
 is a Hindu temple located at Tirukkallil (now known as Tirukkandalam) in Tiruvallur district, Tamil Nadu, India. The presiding deity is Shiva. He is called as Sivanandeswarar. His consort is known as Anandavalli Ammai.

Significance 
It is one of the shrines of the 275 Paadal Petra Sthalams - Shiva Sthalams glorified in the early medieval Tevaram poems by Tamil Saivite Nayanar Sambandar.

References 

Shiva temples in Tiruvallur district
Padal Petra Stalam